Chondrodysplasia Blomstrand  is a rare disorder caused by mutation of the parathyroid hormone receptor resulting in the absence of a functioning PTHR1. It results in ossification of the endocrine system and intermembraneous tissues and advanced skeletal maturation.

References

External links 

Endocrine diseases